Aranbanga is a rural locality in the North Burnett Region, Queensland, Australia.

Geography 
Aranbanga Creek rises in the centre of the locality and flows west towards Pile Gully. The Johngboon State Forest is located in the south-east of the locality.

The principal land use is grazing, but there is a small area of irrigated crops from a small dam in the centre of the locality.

History 
The locality and creek both takes their names from an early pastoral run in the district. In 1852 the Aranbanga run was transferred from George Mocatta to W.T. and G.M. Elliott. The run appears by that name on an 1872 and 1878 maps.

Education 
There are no schools in Aranbanga. The nearest primary and secondary schools are in Gaynah.

References 

North Burnett Region
Localities in Queensland